Laurence Dumont (born 2 June 1958) is a French politician of the Socialist Party who has been serving as Member of Parliament of the National Assembly from 1997 until 2002 and again between 2007 and 2022, representing the 2nd constituency of Calvados.

Political career
In parliament, Dumont has served on the Committee on Foreign Affairs from 1997 to 2001 and again since 2017. She was also a member of the Committee on Social Affairs (2009-2012) and the Committee on Legal Affairs (2012-2017). Since 2011, she has also been serving as vice president of the National Assembly.

In the Socialist Party's 2017 presidential primaries, Dumont publicly endorsed Benoît Hamon as the party's candidate for the 2017 French presidential election.

See also
 2017 French legislative election

References

1958 births
Living people
21st-century French women politicians
Deputies of the 11th National Assembly of the French Fifth Republic
Deputies of the 13th National Assembly of the French Fifth Republic
Deputies of the 14th National Assembly of the French Fifth Republic
Deputies of the 15th National Assembly of the French Fifth Republic
People from Vincennes
Politicians from Normandy
Socialist Party (France) politicians
Women members of the National Assembly (France)